Splice is a 2009 science fiction horror film directed by Vincenzo Natali and starring Adrien Brody, Sarah Polley, and Delphine Chanéac. The story concerns experiments in genetic engineering being done by a young scientific couple, who attempt to introduce human DNA into their work of splicing animal genes.  Guillermo del Toro, Don Murphy, and Joel Silver are the executive producers of this film. Theatrically released on June 4, 2010, the film received generally positive reviews from critics but grossed just $27 million against a $30 million production budget.

Plot 
Genetic engineers Clive Nicoli and Elsa Kast hope to achieve fame by splicing animal DNA to create hybrids for medical use at the company N.E.R.D. (Nucleic Exchange Research and Development). Their work has yielded Fred and Ginger, two large vermiform creatures intended as mates for each other. After successfully mating them, Clive and Elsa plan to create a revolutionary human-animal hybrid. Their employers Joan Chorot and William Barlow forbid this and order them to focus on identifying and extracting proteins from Fred and Ginger for drug production. Clive and Elsa, however, follow their plans in secret and develop a viable prepubescent female creature. Although they planned to terminate before the hybrid reached full term, Elsa persuades Clive to let it live. The hybrid physically ages much faster than humans and mentally develops like a human child. After it spells out NERD with toys, seeing the acronym on Elsa's shirt, Elsa names it "Dren".

Clive’s brother Gavin discovers Dren, but flees after she jumps on him. Elsa notices Dren has a fever and tries to cool her in an industrial-sized sink of cold water. Clive holds Dren underwater. This forces Dren to use her gills, revealing she is amphibious. Elsa forms a motherly bond with Dren. Meanwhile, she and Clive neglect their work with Fred and Ginger. At a publicized presentation, Fred and Ginger fight and kill each other. Ginger had spontaneously changed into a male, but Elsa and Clive failed to notice, as they were focused on Dren.

The couple moves Dren to the isolated farm where Elsa grew up. Dren reveals she has carnivorous tendencies and retractable wings and enters adolescence. She grows bored of confinement, but Elsa and Clive fear she might be discovered outside. Clive realizes the human DNA used to create Dren is not that of an anonymous donor, as Elsa told him, but Elsa's. After Dren kills her pet cat with the stinger on her tail, Elsa restrains her roughly and amputates the stinger, then uses it to synthesize a protein for their work. While alone with each other, Dren uses her pheromones to seduce Clive and has sex with him, much to Elsa's horror. Clive accuses her of not wanting a "normal" child prior to that because of her fear of losing control. They return to the farm to terminate Dren, but find her seemingly dying.

William Barlow discovers human DNA in Dren's protein samples and arrives at the barn with Gavin, who revealed the location. Elsa says Dren is dead and buried behind the barn. Dren, having spontaneously metamorphosed into a male, rises from the grave and attacks them, killing Barlow and Gavin before raping Elsa. Clive attacks Dren to help Elsa but is overpowered by Dren. Elsa attacks Dren to help Clive but hesitates, which allows Dren to kill Clive. Elsa then kills Dren.

In an office tower, Joan tells Elsa that Dren's body contained numerous biochemical compounds, for which the company is filing patents. She offers a visibly pregnant Elsa a large sum of money to go through with the pregnancy, which Elsa accepts.

Cast 
 Adrien Brody as Clive Nicoli
 Sarah Polley as Elsa Kast
 Delphine Chanéac as Dren
 Abigail Chu as Child Dren
 Brandon McGibbon as Gavin Nicoli
 Simona Maicanescu as Joan Chorot
 David Hewlett as William Barlow

Production 
Splice was written by director Vincenzo Natali and screenwriters Antoinette Terry Bryant and Doug Taylor. The script was originally meant to follow up Natali's Cube (1997), but the budget and restricted technology hindered the project. In 2007, the project entered active development as a 75% Canadian and 25% French co-production, receiving a budget of $26 million. The director described the film: "Splice is very much about our genetic future and the way science is catching up with much of the fiction out there. [This] is a serious film and an emotional one. And there's sex... Very, very unconventional sex. The centerpiece of the movie is a creature which goes through a dramatic evolutionary process. The goal is to create something shocking but also very subtle and completely believable."

In October 2007, actors Brody and Polley were cast into the lead roles. Production began the following November in Toronto. It was aided by Telefilm Canada's funding of US$2.5 million. Filming took place in Toronto and concluded in February 2008.

In an interview, when asked if there would be any sequels, Natali responded, "I don't think so. It could happen, but it would have required the movie to make a lot of money in the States, but even though the ending of the film appears to be setting up a sequel, that was never my intention. All of my films end with a question, and somewhat ambiguously, and they always imply the beginning of another story. I like to leave the audience with something to ponder."

Release
The film premiered on October 6, 2009 at the Sitges Film Festival, where it won "Best Special Effects" and was in the running for "Best Film", and was part of the 2010 Sundance Film Festival in Park City, Utah. After a bidding war with Apparition, The Weinstein Company, Newmarket Films, First Look Studios, and Samuel Goldwyn Films, Dark Castle Entertainment purchased the U.S rights to the film and the worldwide rights to any possible sequels in February 2010, thinking they "found the next Paranormal Activity". The film received a wide release in the United States on June 4, 2010, with Warner Bros. as distributor. The trailer was attached to two other Warner Bros. movies, The Losers and A Nightmare on Elm Street.  The film opened on June 4, 2010 in wide release to a $7.4 million opening weekend in 2,450 theaters, averaging $3,014 per theater. Splice was released on DVD and Blu-ray on October 5, 2010, in the US and on November 29, 2010, in the UK.

Reception 
  Audiences polled by CinemaScore gave the film an average grade of "D" on an A+ to F scale.

Manohla Dargis of The New York Times wrote that Natali "hasn't reinvented the horror genre" but "has done the next best thing with an intelligent movie that, in between its small boos and an occasional hair-raising jolt, explores chewy issues like bioethics, abortion, corporate-sponsored science, commitment problems between lovers and even Freudian-worthy family dynamics." Andrew O'Hehir from Salon said "Dark, sleek, funny and creepily infectious, the genetic-engineering horror-comedy Splice is a dynamic comeback vehicle for Canadian genre director Vincenzo Natali, who made a splash a few years ago with Cube." Lisa Schwarzbaum from Entertainment Weekly gave the film an A− and stated, "The outstanding creature effects by Howard Berger only get more astonishing as Splice splits into an eerie horror picture, then divides again into something out of Rosemary's Baby." Roger Ebert from the Chicago Sun-Times called it "well done and intriguing" but said it is disappointing in that it does not explore Dren's persona. Comparing the film to David Cronenberg's The Brood, Peter Travers from Rolling Stone said, "Played as a child by Abigail Chu and as an adult by Delphine Chanéac, Dren morphs into a special-effects miracle, sexy and scary in equal doses." and gave the film 3 out of 4.  Also comparing the sex scenes to Cronenberg's work, Mick LaSalle of the San Francisco Chronicle rated it 2/4 stars and wrote that while it has several disgusting scenes, it is "a regulation monster movie" that is "too dumb to be serious and too slow to be entertaining". Richard Roeper panned Splice, calling it one of the worst movies of 2010. He gave the film a D+, calling it "ridiculous" but giving it credit for trying to be different.

Accolades 
Splice won the 2011 Telefilm Golden Box Office Award, CAD$40,000, for being the highest-grossing Canadian feature film in English in 2010.

The film was nominated for Best Science Fiction Film at 37th Saturn Awards, but lost to Inception, another film from Warner Bros.

References

External links 

 
 
 
 
 
 Podcast Interview with Vincenzo Natali about Splice (daily.greencine.com)

2009 films 
2000s science fiction horror films
Canadian LGBT-related films
Canadian science fiction horror films
English-language Canadian films
English-language French films
French LGBT-related films
French science fiction horror films
LGBT-related science fiction horror films
2000s pregnancy films
2000s monster movies
2000s English-language films
Biopunk films
Gaumont Film Company films
Copperheart Entertainment films
Canal+ films
Dark Castle Entertainment films
Films about genetic engineering
Films about cloning
Films about scientists
Films set on farms
Fictional human hybrids
Films shot in Toronto
Films directed by Vincenzo Natali
Films about rape
Films with screenplays by Vincenzo Natali
American pregnancy films
Transgender-related films
Warner Bros. films
2000s American films
2000s Canadian films
2000s French films